is a 2013 Japanese drama film directed by Yukihiko Tsutsumi. It was released in Japan on 25 May.

Cast
Shihori Kanjiya
Naoto Takenaka
Takayuki Takuma
Tomoko Tabata
Ai Hashimoto
Rei Okamoto
Kyūsaku Shimada
Yumi Asō
Mitsuru Hirata

Reception

Accolades

References

External links

2013 drama films
2013 films
Films directed by Yukihiko Tsutsumi
Japanese drama films
2010s Japanese films